Chakkaram is a 1968 Indian Tamil-language film written and directed by A. Kasilingam. The film stars Gemini Ganesan, Vennira Aadai Nirmala and A. V. M. Rajan. It was released on 6 December 1968, and failed commercially.

Plot 

Jambu is a thief who lives in the forests avoiding the police. Meenakshi, an estate owner under heavy debt, has a son. Her secretary Babu has a sister who is a college student falls in love with Meenakshi's son. Meenakshi stipulates that she is to be paid , otherwise the marriage between her son and Babu's sister will not take place. Babu and his friends head to the forest in search of Jambu to obtain the money he has robbed and the reward. The rest of the story deals with how the money is obtained.

Cast 
Adapted from The Hindu:

Gemini Ganesan as Babu
Vennira Aadai Nirmala
A. V. M. Rajan as Jambu
Nagesh
Manorama
 Sowcar Janaki
 Major Sundarrajan
O. A. K. Thevar
M. R. R. Vasu
C.S. Pandian
S.S. Sivasuriyan
Master Sekhar
Rajakokila

Production 
Chakkaram was directed by A. Kasilingam who also wrote the screenplay. The film was produced by K. R. Balan under Annai Films. Cinematography was handled by Vijayan.

Soundtrack 
The soundtrack was composed by S. M. Subbaiah Naidu, while the lyrics were written by Vaali.

Release and reception 
Chakkaram was released on 6 December 1968, and failed commercially.

References

External links 
 

1960s action films
1960s Tamil-language films
Films scored by S. M. Subbaiah Naidu
Indian action films